Susana Alimivna Jamaladinova (born 27 August 1983), known professionally as Jamala, is a Ukrainian singer. She represented  and won the Eurovision Song Contest 2016 in Stockholm, Sweden, with her song "1944" about the Deportation of the Crimean Tatars. In 2017, 2018, 2019, 2022 and 2023 she served as a judge at Vidbir, the Ukrainian national selection for the Eurovision Song Contest.

Early life
Susana Dzhamaladinova was born in Osh, Kirghiz SSR, to a Muslim Crimean Tatar father and an Armenian mother. Her Crimean Tatar ancestors were forcibly resettled from Crimea to the central Asian republic under Joseph Stalin during World War II, although her own relatives fought on the Soviet side. In 1989 her family returned to Crimea. Her maternal ancestors are Armenians from Nagorno-Karabakh region They were well-to-do peasants until her great-grandfather's land was confiscated and he was exiled to Osh where he changed his Armenian name to make it sound more Russian.

Her parents divorced for about four years so that her mother could purchase a house in Crimea for the family under her maiden name. During this period, Soviet authorities did not allow ethnic Crimean Tatars, like her father, to purchase property in Crimea.

Career

2010–2015: Early work
Jamala has been fond of music since her early childhood. She made her first professional recording at the age of nine, singing 12 folk and children's Crimean Tatar songs. She entered the Simferopol Music College and later graduated from Tchaikovsky National Music Academy of Ukraine as an opera singer, but preferred a career in pop music.

On 14 February 2010, she released her first single "You Are Made of Love" from her debut studio album For Every Heart. She released "It's Me, Jamala" as the second single on 18 October 2010. On 23 November 2010, she released "Smile" as the third single from the album. Early in 2011, she participated on the national selection show in an attempt to represent  at the Eurovision Song Contest with the song "Smile". The song was a crowd favorite and Jamala herself managed to land a spot in the finals of the competition. However, she later decided to withdraw from the competition. On 12 April 2011, she released her debut studio album For Every Heart through Moon Records Ukraine. On 8 November 2012, she released "Ya Lyublyu Tebya" as the lead single from her second studio album All or Nothing.

She released "Hurt" as the second single, and "Kaktus" was released on 6 March 2013, as the third and final single from the album. She released All or Nothing on 19 March 2013, through Moon Records Ukraine. On 25 September 2014, she released "Zaplutalas" as the lead single from her debut EP Thank You. The EP was released on 1 October 2014, through Enjoy Records. On 26 March 2015, "Ochyma" was released as the lead single from her third studio album. "Shlyakh dodomu" was released as the second single on 18 May 2015. On 15 June 2015, "Podykh" was released as the third single. She released her album Podykh on 12 October 2015, through Enjoy Records.

2016–present: Eurovision Song Contest and subsequent projects 

Jamala successfully represented  in the Eurovision Song Contest 2016 with the song "1944". The song is about the deportation of the Crimean Tatars in 1944 and particularly about her great-grandmother, who lost her daughter while being deported to Central Asia. Jamala wrote the song's lyrics in 2014. In the second semi-final of the contest, Jamala performed 14th and was one of ten participants who qualified for the grand final. It was announced later that she placed second, scoring 287 points, and won the televoting with 152 points On 14 May 2016, Jamala won the competition with 534 points. Jamala's song was considered by Russian media and lawmakers to be critical of the Russian annexation of Crimea in 2014 and the "ongoing war between Russia and Ukraine" in Donbas.

After her Eurovision Song Contest victory, she was awarded the title People's Artist of Ukraine by then-Ukrainian president Petro Poroshenko. She has then continued to release new music, including "I Believe in U", which she performed at the Eurovision Song Contest 2017 as an interval act, along with "Zamanyly".

On 17 May 2016, Poroshenko announced that the Ukrainian Foreign Ministry would be nominating Jamala as a UNICEF Goodwill Ambassador.

On 12 October 2018, Jamala released her fifth studio album, Kryla. The title track was released as the first single on 21 March 2018. She had previously performed the track as the interval act for the 2018 Ukrainian national selection for the Eurovision Song Contest, Vidbir.

In 2022, she joined Polish TV show "Dancing with the Stars: Taniec z Gwiazdami (season 26)".

Personal life
On 26 April 2017, Jamala married Bekir Suleimanov. Their relationship became known in September 2016, when she appeared with him at the Manhattan Short Film Festival. The couple married in the Kyiv Islamic Cultural Center using the traditional wedding ceremony Nikah. Suleimanov had recently graduated from the Physics and Mathematics Department of Taras Shevchenko National University of Kyiv and is an activist of the Muslim Crimean Tatar community.

In November 2017, Jamala announced that she and Suleimanov were expecting their first child together. On 27 March 2018 their son Emir-Rahman Seit-Bekir ogly Suleimanov was born.

Jamala's mother tongue is Russian, and she is also fluent in Ukrainian which she learned as an adolescent. She has also written a few songs in Crimean Tatar.

In February 2022, amidst the 2022 Russian invasion of Ukraine, she and her two children left Ukraine and initially took refuge in Romania, before eventually landing in Turkey.

Discography

Studio albums

Live albums

Compilation albums

Remix albums

Extended plays

Singles

Filmography

Notes

References

External links

 

Living people
1983 births
English-language singers from Ukraine
Russian-language singers
People from Osh
21st-century Ukrainian women singers
Kyrgyzstani women singers
Kyrgyzstani people of Crimean Tatar descent
Ukrainian pop singers
Ukrainian singer-songwriters
Ukrainian sopranos
Ukrainian people of Armenian descent
Ukrainian people of Crimean Tatar descent
Eurovision Song Contest entrants for Ukraine
Ukrainian Muslims
Eurovision Song Contest entrants of 2016
Eurovision Song Contest winners
Recipients of the title of People's Artists of Ukraine
Crimean Tatar musicians
Kyrgyzstani people of Armenian descent
New Wave winners
Ukrainian refugees